Godse may refer to:

People 
Godse is a Marathi Brahmin surname.
 Dattatraya Ganesh Godse, Indian playwright
 Hemant Godse, a member of the 16th Lok Sabha of India. He represents Nashik constituency of Maharashtra and is a member of the Shiv Sena.
 Mugdha Godse, Indian model
 Nathuram Godse (1910–1949), Mahatma Gandhi's assassin
 Vishnubhat Godse, Hindu priest

Film 
 Godse (film), a 2021 Indian Telugu-language film